Matisse is an impact crater on the southern hemisphere of Mercury.  Matisse takes its name from the French artist Henri Matisse, and it was named by the IAU in 1976.

Within Matisse is a dark spot of low reflectance material (LRM).  The dark spot is associated with hollows.  The dark spot is located on the southwest rim of an unnamed crater on the north rim of Matisse.

The smaller crater Lessing is to the south of Matisse.

References

Impact craters on Mercury